Caroline Loir (born 20 January 1988 in Amiens) is a French slalom canoeist who has competed at the international level since 2006.

She won a bronze medal in the C1 event at the 2013 ICF Canoe Slalom World Championships in Prague. She also won three golds, one silver and one bronze at the European Canoe Slalom Championships.

World Cup individual podiums

References

1988 births
French female canoeists
Living people
Sportspeople from Amiens
Medalists at the ICF Canoe Slalom World Championships